Chicago Public Schools is headed by a Chief Executive Officer (CEO) appointed by the mayor of Chicago. Currently serving as CEO is Pedro Martinez. This job is equivalent to a superintendent, and, before 1995, the occupant of this office was known as the "superintendent of Chicago Public Schools".

History
The position of chief executive officer was preceded by one of "Superintendent". The first individual to hold this position had been John Clark Dore, who assumed the position in 1854. In 1855, the authority to remove the Superintendent was given to the Board of School Inspectors by the same ordinance which created the city's first high school, meaning the Chicago Common Council (today known as the "Chicago City Council") no longer held this authority.

The role of Superintendent, when established, did not have well defined duties. The office was originally subordinate to the Board of School Inspectors, and later the Chicago Board of Education (which supplanted the Board of School Inspectors in 1857). Its powers were limited. The role was, in part, shaped by its officeholders over the years. Since the ordinance which established the office did not require administrative authority to be given to the superintendent, there was no clear delineation of policymaking and administrative roles between the superintendent and the school board.

In practice, a stronger superintendency was developed, beginning under Edwin G. Cooley's tenure. However, it was not until the 1917 Otis Bill that the superintendency was granted exclusive administrative power over schools.

In 1995, the Government of Illinois passed the Chicago School Reform Amendatory Act, which replaced the position of superintendent with that of chief executive officer. The first individual to serve under the title of CEO was Paul Vallas.

Officeholders

Superintendents of Chicago Public Schools
The following is a table listing the individuals that held the position of "superintendent of Chicago Public Schools" from its creation in 1854 through its dissolution in 1995:

Chief Executive Officers of Chicago Public Schools
The following is a table listing the individuals that have held the position of "chief executive officer of Chicago Public Schools" since it was created in 1995:

References